Omphalea ankaranensis is a plant species endemic to a small region in northern Madagascar. Type locale is in Antsiranana Province, inside Réserve Speciale Ankarana, 7 km SE of Matsaborimanga. Plant grows on limestone soils.

Omphalea ankaranensis is a tree up to 7 m tall. Leaves are heart-shaped, up to 16 cm long. Inflorescence is a racemous thyrse.

References

ankaranensis
Endemic flora of Madagascar